Sykes's lark (Galerida deva) is a species of lark found in the dry open country of India. Its distribution is mainly restricted to central India, although stray records have been found elsewhere on the sub-continent. It is identified by its prominent crest and its overall rufous colouration. It has streaks on its breast which are less prominent than those found in the Oriental skylark.

It can imitate the calls of 34 other birds within its habitat.

Taxonomy and systematics
Originally, Sykes's lark was classified as belonging to the genus Alauda. Alternate names for Sykes's skylark include Deccan crested lark, Deccan lark, Sykes's crested-lark, tawny crested lark and tawny lark.

References

Gallery

Sykes's lark
Birds of India
Endemic birds of India
Sykes's lark